Noritate is a topical cream usually prescribed for rosacea, a disease of the skin commonly associated with adult acne and most notably frequent to constant flushing of the face around the cheeks and chin area.

Noritate contains 1% anti-inflammatory drug metronidazole designed to reduce redness in inflamed areas.

While noritate may get rid of some pustules and reduce redness, it has been shown to result in acne in an exceptionally small number of users. The drug information pamphlet claims only 1% of users see ill effects. In many cases, users see no reduction in general redness associated with rosacea and sometimes even a worsening effect. Similar results are reported for Metrogel, which contains the same 1% metronidazole.

References

Skin care brands